El Potrero is a corregimiento in Calobre District, Veraguas Province, Panama with a population of 635 as of 2010. Its population as of 1990 was 687; its population as of 2000 was 650.

References

Corregimientos of Veraguas Province